''For INC politician from Sadabad UP India, see Javed Ali Khan

Javed Ali Khan (born 31 October 1962) is a politician from Samajwadi Party was a Member of the Rajya Sabha representing Uttar Pradesh in the upper house of the Indian Parliament from 2014 -2020. He was appointed the District President of the Samajwadi Party from District Moradabad in 2005 and also contested the 2007 Vidhan Sabha elections from Thakurdwara, Uttar Pradesh.

Early life and education
Khan was born in Mirzapur Nasrullapur in Sambhal district, Uttar Pradesh. He holds a M.A. in Political Science and a Diploma in Civil Engineering from Jamia Millia Islamia and Osmania University.

References

Living people
1962 births
People from Sambhal district
Osmania University alumni
Jamia Millia Islamia alumni
Rajya Sabha members from Uttar Pradesh
Samajwadi Party politicians from Uttar Pradesh